This is a list of producers, all of whom have presided over the running of the ITV soap opera Coronation Street at some point since it began on 9 December 1960. In the early days, producers came and went on a regular basis, some repeating several short stints over a number of years. In recent years however, with the established structure of the show and storylining more advanced than ever, producers are more likely to stay for longer periods. The dates are the day that their first and last episodes aired.

References

Producers